Nasiliu.net (No To Violence) is a Russian nonprofit organization founded in 2015, which supports women who experience domestic violence. Its director is Anna Rivina.

In 2020 Nasiliu.net offered consultations to 960 victims of domestic violence at their premises.

In December 2020 the Russian Justice Ministry declared Nasiliu.net to be a 'foreign agent'. In February 2021 the Justice Ministry threatened to dissolve the group entirely, alleging charter violations. That month Nasiliu.net received an unsigned demand, allegedly from the Federal Agency for State Property Management, to "urgently vacate the premises voluntarily".Their landlord subsequently showed up and told them that they needed to vacate the premises. In March 2021 the group's legal challenge to its foreign agent status was refused by the Zamoskvoretsky Court. In April 2021 a Russian court fined the organization 300,000 roubles for infringing the foreign agent legislation.

In August 2021 the group announced it would provide emergency accommodation in Moscow hotels and hostels for victims of domestic violence.

References

External links
 

Domestic violence-related organizations
Domestic violence in Russia
Feminist organizations in Russia
Non-profit organizations based in Russia
2015 establishments in Russia
Organizations established in 2015